Shmulik Brener (שמוליק ברנר; also Shmuel Brener; March 8, 1981) is an Israeli former professional basketball player and coach. He played the point guard position. In 2010 Brener was named to the Israeli Basketball Premier League Quintet.

Biography
Brener was 6' 2" (1.88 m) tall.

He played for Hapoel Galil Elyon, Ironi Kiryat Ata, Haifa, Ironi Ramat Gan, Elitzur Netanya, BC Habikaa, and Hapoel Gilboa Galil.

In 2010, Brener was named to the Israeli Basketball Premier League Quintet. He played in the 2011 BSL All-Star Game.

After his playing career, Brener was head coach of Maccabi Rishon LeZion.

References 

Living people

Maccabi Haifa B.C. players
Ironi Ramat Gan players
Maccabi Rishon LeZion

1981 births
Hapoel Galil Elyon players
Israeli men's basketball players
Point guards
Israeli basketball coaches